The Miskar gas field is a natural gas field located in the Gulf of Gabès. It was discovered in 1975 and developed by BG Group. It began production in 1996 and produces natural gas and condensates. The total proven reserves of the Miskar gas field are around 1.5 trillion cubic feet (43 km³), and production is slated to be around 200 million cubic feet/day (5.7×105m³).

References

Natural gas fields in Tunisia
2006 establishments in Tunisia